Bernard Raphael Goldstein (born January 29, 1938) is a historian of science and professor emeritus at the University of Pittsburgh. Goldstein published on the history of astronomy in medieval Islamic and Jewish civilization and early modern times.

Selected publications 
 The Astronomy of al-Biṭrūjī
 The Astronomy of Levi ben Gerson (1288–1344), Springer-Verlag, 1985
  "Theological Foundations of Kepler’s Astronomy," Osiris 16 (2001) (with Peter Barker)
 "Astronomy in the Iberian Peninsula: Abraham Zacut and the Transition from Manuscript to Print," Transactions of the American Philosophical Society 90.2 (2000) (with José Chabás)

External links 
 Academic homepage at the University of Pittsburgh
 Autobiography
 Papers

Historians of astronomy
American historians of science
Living people
1938 births
University of Pittsburgh faculty